Strangers on a Train may refer to:

Strangers on a Train (novel), Patricia Highsmith's novel
Strangers on a Train (film), Alfred Hitchcock's adaptation of the novel
Strangers on a Train (play), Craig Warner's play based on the novel
Strangers on a Train (album), by The Left Banke
"Strangers on a Train" (song), a 1980 song by The Sports